Joseph Jean-Philippe Gauthier (April 29, 1937 – February 20, 2013) was a Canadian professional ice hockey defenceman who played 166 games in the National Hockey League (NHL) with the Montreal Canadiens, Boston Bruins and Philadelphia Flyers and 31 games in the World Hockey Association (WHA) with the New York Raiders between 1960 and 1973. Gauthier was born in Montreal, Quebec. He died in 2013 at the age of 75.

Awards
Memorial Cup Championships (1957)
CPHL First All-Star Team (1965)
CPHL Second All-Star Team (1966)
Stanley Cup champions (1965)

Career statistics

Regular season and playoffs

References

External links
 

1937 births
2013 deaths
Baltimore Clippers players
Boston Bruins players
Canadian ice hockey defencemen
Flin Flon Bombers players
French Quebecers
Houston Apollos players
Hull-Ottawa Canadiens players
Ice hockey people from Montreal
Long Island Ducks (ice hockey) players
Montreal Canadiens players
Montreal Voyageurs players
St. Boniface Canadiens players
New York Raiders players
Ontario Hockey Association Senior A League (1890–1979) players
Omaha Knights (CHL) players
Philadelphia Flyers players
Providence Reds players
Quebec Aces (AHL) players
Rochester Americans players
Seattle Totems (WHL) players
Stanley Cup champions